Murialdo is a comune (municipality) in the Province of Savona in the Italian region Liguria, located about  west of Genoa and about  west of Savona.

The municipality of Murialdo contains the "Borgate" (subdivisions, mainly villages and hamlets): Piani, Piavata, Piano, Ponte, Bonetti, Valle, Isolagrande and Riofreddo.

Murialdo borders the following municipalities: Calizzano, Castelnuovo di Ceva, Massimino, Millesimo, Osiglia, Perlo, Priero, and Roccavignale.

Demographic evolution

Twin towns — sister cities
Murialdo is twinned with:
  Schweich, Germany (1994)

Related articles 
 Monte Camulera

References

Cities and towns in Liguria